John Bennet Lawes was an entrepreneur and scientist.

John Lawes may also refer to:
Sir John Lawes School, a secondary school in Harpenden, United Kingdom
 John Lawes (company director) (1907–1978), Australian chairman of QBE Insurance